Edmund Wright may refer to:
Edmund Wright (d.1583), MP for Steyning, Sussex
Sir Edmund Wright (lord mayor) (died 1643), Lord Mayor of London
Edmund Wright (architect) (1824–1888), architect and Mayor of Adelaide
Edmund Wright (footballer) (1902–1978), English goalkeeper

See also
Edward Wright (mathematician) (1561–1615)
E. M. Wright (1906–2005), mathematician